Ruy López de Villalobos ( – 23 April 1546) was a Spanish explorer who led a failed attempt to colonize the Philippines in 1543, attempting to assert Spanish control there under the terms of the treaties of Tordesillas and Zaragoza. Unable to feed his men through barter, raiding, or farming and unable to request resupply from Mexico due to poor knowledge of the Pacific's winds and currents, López de Villalobos abandoned his mission and fled to the Portuguese-held Moluccas, where he died in prison. He is chiefly remembered for some sources crediting him with naming Leyte the "Philippine Island" in honor of the Spanish crown prince Philip (later King PhilipII). The name was later extended across the entire Philippine Archipelago and its nation. (Other sources credit the name to one of his captains, Bernardo de la Torre.)

Philippine Expedition

López de Villalobos was commissioned in 1541 by Antonio de Mendoza, the viceroy of New Spain and first colonial administrator in the New World, to send an expedition to the Philippines, then known to the Spanish as the "Islands of the West". They lay at the far western frontier of the division of the world between Spain and Portugal established by the treaties of Tordesillas and Zaragozain fact they lay over the line within the Portuguese areaand there was a need to establish a larger Spanish presence there as a base for trade with the Spice Islands and China. If possible, the goal was to extend Spanish control over the Moluccas in the Portuguese East Indies. López de Villalobos was chosen for the command because he was related to De Mendoza by marriage.

López de Villalobos's fleet of six ships left Barra de Navidad, Jalisco, in New Spain (now Mexico) with 370–400 men on 1 November 1542. He chose Gaspar Rico as the expedition's chief pilot. The second shipthe fleet's was the 120-tonelada galleon , equipped with a cutwater and under the command of Bernardo de la Torre and his pilot Alonso Fernández Tarifeño. It was captained by Francisco Merino and piloted by Francisco Ruiz. The fourth ship of 70 toneladas was the  under Alonso Manrique, piloted by Ginés de Mafra, who had been a member of the 1519–1522 Magellan expedition. The fifth was the galley  under Pedro Ortíz de Rueda, piloted by Antonio Corço and powered by sails and 20 pairs of oars. The last was the fusta  under Juan Martel, piloted by Cristóbal de Pareja and powered by sails and 14 pairs of oars. The large number of passengers included a unit of soldiers and a number of gentlemen, who brought black slaves and about 40 Indian men and women as servants. Martín de Islares acted as factor and interpreter; Guido de Lavezaris, later governor of the Philippines, as treasurer; Maestre Anes ("Master Hans"), previously part of both the Magellan and Loaísa expeditions, as chief gunner; and Gerónimo de Santisteban as head of the voyage's clergy, which included 3 other Augustinian priests and 4 or 5 deacons.

The fleet first encountered the Revilla Gigedo Islands off the west coast of Mexico, among which the sighting of Roca Partida was reported for the first time. On 26 December 1542 they sighted a group of islands in the Marshalls that they called the Corals,  which most probably are those of the Wotje Atoll. They thought these to be the Islands of the Kings previously charted by Álvaro de Saavedra in his 1528 expedition. They anchored at one of the islets, which they named San or Santo Esteban ("St. Stephen"). They left on 6 January 1543 and that same day they sighted several small islands on the same latitude as the Corals, which they named the Garden Islands, now the Kwajalein Atoll. On 23 January 1543, the expedition found Fais in the Carolines, which they charted as the Sailors. On 26 January 1543, they charted some new islands as the Reefs which have since been identified as the Yaps, also part of the Carolines.

According to Spate, Villalobos's crew included the pilot Juan Gaetan, credited by La Perouse for the discovery of Hawaii. Gaetan's voyage was described in similar terms in 1753 with the same sequence of islands and no identification of any others known by the time of the account. In 1825, the Portuguese geographer Casado Giraldes stated that the "Sandwich Islands"i.e. the Hawaiian Islandswere discovered by Gaetan in 1542 and did not even mention James Cook.

From 6–23 January 1543, the galley now piloted by De Mafrawas separated from the other ships after a severe storm. It eventually reached the island of Mazaua, where Magellan had anchored in 1521. The area has since been identified as Limasawa in southern Leyte. Its history was subsequently recorded in 1667 by the Jesuit priest Francisco Combés.

Although he was attempting to reach Cebu, López de Villalobos ignored the advice of his pilot to lead the ships north of Mindanao. Instead, on February 2, the fleet reached northeastern Mindanao, exposed to the weather coming from the open ocean and separated from any Chinese or Malay traders. Stuck in place, they repaired their ships after the voyage. Bernardo de la Torre or López de Villalobos named Mindanao Cesarea Karoli in honor of the Habsburg emperor Charles V, who was also king of Spain as Carlos I. The fleet stayed there for 32 days while suffering extreme hunger and attempting to find supplies. They resorted to eating grubs, unknown plants, land crabs that sickened the crew, and a phosphorescent gray lizard which killed most of those who ate it. Villalobos ordered his men to plant corn but it failed. On March 31, the fleet left for Mazaua in search of food but could not make progress due to the lack of wind. After several days, they reached Sarangani, where they lost six men while raiding a local village for supplies. During this period, either Bernardo de la Torre or López de Villalobos named Leyte and Samar the Philippines in honor of Charles's son the crown prince Philip (later King PhilipII).

On August 7, a Portuguese ship arrived with a letter from Jorge de Castro, governor of the Moluccas. De Castro demanded an explanation for the presence of the Spaniards in Portuguese territory, in response to which López de Villalobos drafted a letter dated August 9. His letter repeated the Spanish claims to the islands, saying they were within the Demarcation Line of the Crown of Castile under the relevant treaties.

On August 27, the  left for New Spain under De la Torre, directed to explain the expedition's difficulties and request additional supplies and reinforcements. A second letter from De Castro arrived in the first week of September; López de Villalobos's reply dated September 12 repeated the same claims as before. The having passed the Volcano Islands and possibly the Bonins without being able to replenish its waterreturned in mid-October without completing its mission. (No attempt to cross the Pacific from west to east would be successful for another two decades.) The natives refused to provide any supplies even for sail, fearing Portuguese retribution.

In April of 1544, he sailed for Ambon Island and then Samar and Leyte. This left on 16 May 1545 and hugged the coast of New Guineawhich Ortiz de Retez nameduntil August 12, when the ship was forced to turn back once again. It reached Tidore in October. Repulsed by hunger, hostile natives, and further shipwreck, López de Villalobos finally abandoned the remaining goals of the expedition. He and his crew members sought refuge in the Moluccas but, quarrelling with the Portuguese, were imprisoned.

López de Villalobos died of a tropical fever on Good Friday 23 April 1546, in his prison cell on Ambon Island. The Portuguese described him dying "of a broken heart". Popular legend made his deathbed nurse the Jesuit missionary and later saint Francis Xavier.

Some 117 of the crew survived, including De Mafra, Juan Gaetan, and Guido de Lavezaris. Juan Gaetan's account of the Villalobos voyage was published in 15501559 by Giovanni Battista Ramusio, an Italian historian, in his Navigations and Travels. De Mafra produced a manuscript on Magellan's voyage and had this delivered to Spain by a friend. They sailed for Malacca, where the Portuguese put them on a ship for Lisbon. Thirtyincluding De Mafraelected to remain instead. His manuscript remained unrecognized for many centuries until being rediscovered in the early 20th century. It was published in 1920. The survivors who had left Spain or Portugal and returned home were individually circumnavigators of the world, although the expedition itself did not accomplish that.

The inaccurate accounts of López de Villalobos and his men led Spain to believe that the Pacific was much smaller than it actually was for the rest of the 16th century.

Notes

References

Citations

Bibliography
 .
 .
 
 .
 .
 .
 .
 .
 .
 . 
 .
 .
 .
 .
 .

External links
The First Discovery of Australia and New Guinea by Roque Santacruz, Chapter IV
Pacific Maritime History Mazaua: Magellan's Lost Harbour

People of Spanish colonial Philippines
Spanish explorers
Spanish explorers of the Pacific
Explorers of Asia
People of New Spain
1500 births
1546 deaths
Colonial Mexico
16th-century Spanish people
16th-century explorers
People from Málaga
Spanish East Indies